The silvered antbird (Sclateria naevia) is a passerine bird in the antbird family, the only member of the genus Sclateria. It is a resident breeder in tropical South America from central Brazil to Colombia and Trinidad and south to Peru and Bolivia.

Taxonomy
The silvered antbird was formally described in 1788 by the German naturalist Johann Friedrich Gmelin in his revised and expanded edition of Carl Linnaeus's Systema Naturae. He placed it with the nuthatches in the genus Sitta and coined the binomial name Sitta naevia. Gmelin based his description of the "wall-creeper of Surinam" that had been described and illustrated in 1764 by the English naturalist George Edwards in his Gleanings of Natural History. Edwards's specimen was preserved in spirits. It had been presented to the physician John Fothergill. The silvered antbird is now the only species placed in the genus Sclateria that was introduced in 1899 by the American ornithologist Harry C. Oberholser. The genus name was chosen to honour the ornithologist Philip Sclater. The specific epithet is from the Latin naevius meaning "spotted".

Four subspecies are recognised:
 S. n. naevia (Gmelin, JF, 1788) – east Venezuela, the Guianas, northeast Brazil and Trinidad
 S. n. diaphora Todd, 1913 – central Venezuela
 S. n. argentata (des Murs, 1856) – southeast Colombia and south Venezuela to east Ecuador, east Peru, north Bolivia and west Brazil
 S. n. toddi Hellmayr, 1924 – central south Amazonian Brazil

Description
The silvered antbird is typically 15 cm long, and weighs 20 g. The adult male of the nominate northern form S. n. naevia has dark grey upperparts and dusky wings with two rows of white spots. The underparts are white,  extensively and broadly streaked with grey. The female has dark brown upperparts, with buff wing spots and extensively grey-streaked underparts.

Males of the distinctive Amazonian subspecies S. n. argentata have the flanks and upper chest grey-white with grey mottling, and the females have white central underparts with rufous sides to the head, neck and body.

The silvered antbird has a loud pi-pi-pi-pi-pi-pi-pi call, often the first indication of its presence in its difficult habitat.

Distribution and habitat
This is a skulking terrestrial bird of wet shaded areas, such as in undergrowth or under overhanging vegetation near streams, lagoons or swamps. It is usually found in pairs, foraging on the ground for small insects and other arthropods taken from leaf litter or the water's surface.

References 

silvered antbird
Birds of the Amazon Basin
Birds of the Guianas
Birds of Trinidad and Tobago
silvered antbird
silvered antbird
Birds of Brazil